The Capitán FAP Renán Elías Olivera Airport  is an airport serving Pisco, an oceanside city in the Ica Region of Peru. It is used by the Peruvian Army, but it can be also used by civil aircraft.

A new terminal building entered service in 2015. The new terminal is expected to help bring new airlines and destinations for the city, and plans to become a gateway for international passengers.

The Pisco VOR-DME (Ident: SCO) and non-directional beacon (Ident: SCO) are located on the field.

Airlines and destinations
There are currently no scheduled flights. However, Aerodiana does operate charter flights over the Nazca Lines.

See also
Transport in Peru
List of airports in Peru

References

External links
 OurAirports - Pisco
OpenStreetMap - Pisco
SkyVector Aeronautical Charts

Airports in Peru
Buildings and structures in Ica Region